Emily Bowes Gosse (10 November 1806 – 10 February 1857) was a prolific religious tract writer and author of evangelical Christian poems and articles.

Biography
Emily Bowes was born in London, England to William and Hannah Bowes, both from old New England families. Her early years were divided between Merioneth, Exmouth and London, and in 1824 she commenced work as a governess to Revd John Hawkins in Berkshire, later moving to the home of Revd Sir Christopher John Musgrave, in Hove.

After these spells, Emily returned to London to stay with her parents in Clapton, North London. She attended the Plymouth Brethren assembly in Hackney, where she met her future husband, Philip Henry Gosse.  They had known one another for several years before they married at Brook Street Chapel, Tottenham, in 1848.  Emily was 42, her husband was 38.  Emily gave birth to their only child, Edmund in 1849.

Emily died in Islington after a painful and protracted battle with breast cancer, and was buried in Abney Park Cemetery, Stoke Newington. Among her last words were: "I shall walk with Him in white. Won't you take our lamb and walk with me?"

Painting
It has been incorrectly claimed that Emily was a Victorian landscape painter who studied with John Sell Cotman, and an illustrator whose work includes the uncredited chromolithographs for her husband P. H. Gosse's book The Aquarium: an unveiling of the wonders of the deep sea (1854).

Publications
Gosse was a writer of Christian poetry books and a religious tract author and periodical contributor. Of sixty Narrative Tracts in book form,  fifty-four were written by her and the rest by husband. In total, at least sixty-three Emily Gosse narrative or gospel tracts were published, with an aggregate sale of seven million copies by 1866. She authored 40 periodical articles. Her book Abraham And His Children (1855) consisted of object lessons using Biblical characters to illustrate parenting principles.

Further reading
 Boyd, Robert, Emily Gosse: A Life of Faith and Works : the Story of Her Life and Witness with Her Published Poems and Samples of Her Prose Writings, Olivet Books, 2004. 
 Freeman, R. B. and Douglas Wertheimer, “Emily Gosse: A Bibliography,” Brethren Historical Review 17, 2021, 25-78. ISSN 1755-9383.
 Gosse, Edmund, Father and Son; a study of two temperaments (William Heinemann, 1907, initiallty anonymous and many later editions under his name).
 Gosse, Philip Henry, A Memorial of the Last Days on Earth of Emily Gosse, 1857.
 Lingard, Ann, Seaside Pleasures (Littoralis Press, 2003). 
 Shipton, Anna, Tell Jesus: recollections of Emily Gosse, London: Morgan and Chase, [1863].
 Thwaite, Ann, Glimpses of the Wonderful: The Life of Philip Henry Gosse, 1810-1888 (London: Faber & Faber, 2002)

References

British women artists
Evangelical writers
1806 births
1857 deaths
Artists from London
British Plymouth Brethren
English illustrators
English people of American descent
Deaths from breast cancer
Deaths from cancer in England
English women writers